Dewayne Perkins (born November 5, 1990) is an American comedian, writer, actor, and producer. Born and raised in Chicago, he received improv training at The Second City and also worked for iO Theater. His stand-up comedy was recommended by Variety magazine and Just for Laughs comedy festival. He has appeared on Wild 'n Out and The Upshaws. Perkins was on the writing staff for The Break with Michelle Wolf, the Saved by the Bell reboot, and Brooklyn Nine-Nine, and he is a staff writer for The Amber Ruffin Show, for which he was nominated for a Primetime Emmy Award.

Early life and education 
Perkins was born in Chicago, Illinois and was raised on the south side near Marquette Park. He attended Hearst Elementary School and graduated from Curie High School. He was the first African American male student to receive an International Baccalaureate Diploma from his high school.

Perkins developed his interest in performing through musical theater and improv classes in high school. He attended The Theatre School at DePaul University but was cut after his first year and changed his major to film and animation, where he was introduced to The Second City by his best friend and writing partner Aasia Lashay Bullock. They were hired there after a producer saw his and Bullock's original show Uncle Tom & Jerry Curl: A Black History Month Experience. Perkins received his bachelor's degree from DePaul.

Career

2016–2019: Stand-up and television writing 
After college Perkins continued to work at Second City and as a performer at iO theater, and was a member of the improv trio 3Peat. In 2016, he wrote and performed Black Side of the Moon at Woolly Mammoth Theater in D.C.

He left Second City in 2017 to pursue stand-up. When he transitioned to stand-up, he stated that using Twitter improved his joke writing. His work frequently covers issues of identity such as his race and sexuality.

In April 2018, 3Peat's sketch The Blackening was released online on Comedy Central, about "an all-Black group of friends (who ain't got no business camping) as they get chased by a serial killer." The sketch originated from a variety show sketch Perkins produced at Second City. 
He was hired to write for the sole season of The Break with Michelle Wolf in 2018. He later relocated to Los Angeles and joined the writing staff for season seven of Brooklyn Nine-Nine. In both writer's rooms he was the only Black writer.

2020–present: Television production and The Blackening 
In January 2020, it was announced that The Blackening would be adapted into a full-length film, to be co-written with Tracy Oliver and developed by MRC Film and The Story Company. Directed by Tim Story and starring Perkins, Antoinette Robertson, Jermaine Fowler, Yvonne Orji, and Jay Pharoah, the film wrapped production in December 2021. The film was released at TIFF in September 2022.

Perkins is a writer for The Amber Ruffin Show and was also a writer for the Saved By the Bell reboot, both released on Peacock in 2020.

In June 2020, Perkins posted a viral Twitter thread alleging institutional racism during his time at The Second City. He "criticized Second City prior’s reluctance to fundraise for the Black Lives Matter movement without also financially supporting police-related causes." He alleged that he and other Black performers were required to see a dialect coach to make their speaking voices more "palatable." He further stated in an interview with The New York Times that he had heard directors use anti-Black slurs, and was traumatized by his overall experience. Several other Black performers replied to the thread. The next day, Second City co-owner Andrew Alexander resigned.

Perkins will write and executive produce the workplace sitcom Chopped & Screwed for ABC in collaboration with Phoebe Robinson. The show is a multi-camera sitcom centered on a Black barbershop and beauty salon that must come together as one entity to serve the superficial and therapeutic needs of their customers and community. In 2022 it was announced that Perkins will executive produce and write Clue, an animated television series adaptation based on the 1985 film. Tim Story will also co-executive produce the series for Fox and Bento Box Entertainment.

Personal life 
Perkins is gay.

Accolades 
 2017 – Best Short-Form Digital Project, New York Television Festival - for Starving Artists in collaboration with Aasia Lashay Bullock
2019 – New Faces of Comedy, Just for Laughs
 2020 – 10 Comics to Watch, Variety

Filmography

Television

Film

Awards and nominations

References

External links 
 Official website
 

Living people
African-American actors
African-American stand-up comedians
American stand-up comedians
African-American screenwriters
LGBT African Americans
American LGBT actors
Writers from Chicago
Male actors from Chicago
Comedians from Illinois
DePaul University alumni
The Second City
American stage actors
21st-century American male writers
African-American male comedians
American male comedians
Entertainers from Illinois
1990 births